In mathematics, a k-Scorza variety is a smooth projective variety, of maximal dimension among those whose k–1 secant varieties are not the whole of projective space. The special case of 2-Scorza varieties are sometimes called Severi varieties, after Francesco Severi.

Classification

Zak showed that k-Scorza varieties are the projective varieties of the rank 1 matrices of rank k simple Jordan algebras.

Severi varieties

The Severi varieties are the non-singular varieties of dimension n (even) in PN that can be isomorphically projected to a hyperplane and satisfy N=3n/2+2.

Severi showed in 1901 that the only Severi variety with n=2 is the Veronese surface in P5.
The only Severi variety with n=4 is the Segre embedding of P2×P2 into P8, found by Scorza in 1908.
The only Segre variety with n=8 is the 8-dimensional Grassmannian G(1,5) of lines in P5 embedded into P14, found by John Greenlees Semple in 1931.
The only Severi variety with n=16 is a 16-dimensional variety E6/Spin(10)U(1) in P26 found by Robert Lazarsfeld in 1981.

These 4 Severi varieties can be constructed in a uniform way, as orbits of groups acting on the complexifications of the 3 by 3 hermitian matrices over the four real (possibly non-associative) division algebras of dimensions 2k = 1, 2, 4, 8.  These representations have complex dimensions 3(2k+1) = 6, 9, 15, and 27, giving varieties of dimension 2k+1 = 2, 4, 8, 16  in projective spaces of dimensions 3(2k)+2 = 5, 8, 14, and 26.

Zak proved that the only Severi varieties are the 4 listed above, of dimensions 2, 4, 8, 16.

References

Algebraic geometry